A list of films produced in the Soviet Union in 1930 (see 1930 in film).

1930

See also
1930 in the Soviet Union

External links
 Soviet films of 1930 at the Internet Movie Database

1930
Soviet
Films